Sir Frederick Messer CBE (12 May 1886 – 8 May 1971) was a British trade unionist and Labour Party politician. He was a member of the House of Commons and Chairman of Middlesex County Council.

Messer was born in north London, and was the son of a poor law officer. He was educated at Thornhill Primary School, Islington before entering an apprenticeship as a French polisher. He became one of the first members of the French Polishers Union. He subsequently changed his career, becoming national organiser of the Industrial Orthopaedic Society.

He was elected as a Labour Party Member of Parliament (MP) for Tottenham South at the 1929 general election. Two years later another election was held and Messer was defeated in a straight fight with the National Labour candidate, Francis Palmer The situation was reversed when he regained the seat from Palmer at the next general election in 1935. He held the seat until its abolition in 1950, and was MP for the successor seat of Tottenham from 1950 until his retirement from parliament in 1959. He was appointed a Commander of the Order of the British Empire in 1948 "for political and public services" and knighted in the 1953 Coronation Honours List.

As well as serving in parliament, he was for many years a member of Middlesex County Council. For 15 years he was chairman of the Labour group on the council, and in 1938 was elevated to become an alderman. He served as chairman of the council from 1947 to 1948, the first member of the Labour Party to hold the chair. A Bevanite, in 1958 he became the first president of Victory for Socialism, a left-wing ginger group within the Labour Party.

References

External links

Labour Party (UK) MPs for English constituencies
Knights Bachelor
Commanders of the Order of the British Empire
UK MPs 1929–1931
UK MPs 1935–1945
UK MPs 1945–1950
UK MPs 1950–1951
UK MPs 1951–1955
UK MPs 1955–1959
1886 births
1971 deaths
Politicians awarded knighthoods
Members of Middlesex County Council
Parliamentary Peace Aims Group